Liberty Tower, officially Liberty Tower Condominiums, is a commercial/residential high-rise building complex in Tulsa, Oklahoma. The building rises 254 feet (77 m). It contains 24 floors, and was completed in 1965. Liberty Tower currently stands as the 11th-tallest building in the city, and the 25th-tallest building in the state of Oklahoma. It also currently stands as the 2nd-tallest commercial-residential building in Tulsa, after the University Club Tower, and the 3rd-tallest in the state. Liberty Tower is the 5th-tallest international style skyscraper in the city, behind the Cityplex Tower, the First Place Tower, the University Club Tower and Cityplex West Tower.

See also
 List of tallest buildings in Tulsa
 Buildings of Tulsa

References

External links
Official site

Residential skyscrapers in Tulsa, Oklahoma
Residential buildings completed in 1965
1965 establishments in Oklahoma